Komló is a town in Baranya county, Hungary. The name of the settlement is derived from the local crop of hops (komló), an ingredient of beer. By the 18th century a depiction of this plant running up a support already featured on the herald of the town.

The former village of Komló became a planned mining city during the socialist era. It was the second biggest mining centre in Hungary after Tatabánya.

History 
The area was inhabited by the Romans, the ruins of 2nd-century Roman villas were discovered during the laying of foundations for new buildings in the area (Mecsekjánosi, Körtvélyes). The existence of the once village is first mentioned in a charter from 1256 as 'villa Compleov', then part of the estates of the Pécsvárad Abbey.

The small settlements that are part of Komló today were already inhabited during the Árpád Age (Kökönyös (Kwkenyes), Gadány-puszta (Gadan), Keményfalva (Kemefalua), Jánosi (Csépán), Mecsekfalu (Szopok), Kisbattyán (Battyan), Zobákpuszta (Zabaguy) and Sikonda (Sicund)).

Komló was not deserted during the Turkish rule, however the population was very scant. Until the end of World War II, the Inhabitants was Danube Swabians. Mostly of the former German Settlers was expelled to Germany and Austria in 1945–1948, about the Potsdam Agreement.
Only a few Germans of Hungary live there, the majority today are the descendants of Hungarians from the Czechoslovak–Hungarian population exchange. 
After 1945, Komló was among those settlements whose expansion into a city was a somewhat forced affair directed by political decisions. A determining factor of its development was the role in coal mining. After more than 100 years of operation mining in the area ceased on 1 January 2000.

Sightseeing 

The ruin of Gothic medieval chapel is situated (dates from 13-14th) behind the church of Komló. A graveyard surrounded the chapel at one time. 
The Museum of the Local History is settled in the centre of the town (there is an exhibition where one can see the footprints of the Komlosaurus carbonis).
Sikonda is a spa resort that belongs to Komló. Its thermal baths was developed around the slightly radioactive and carbonic acid waters discovered in 1928. In 1995 an earlier ruling was confirmed, recognising the therapeutic effects of the thermal waters.

Climate
Climate in this area has mild differences between highs and lows, and there is adequate rainfall year-round.  The Köppen Climate Classification subtype for this climate is "Cfb" (Marine West Coast Climate/Oceanic climate).

Sport
 Komlói Bányász SK, football team

Twin towns – sister cities

Komló is twinned with:
 Beiuș, Romania
 Éragny, France
 Neckartenzlingen, Germany
 Torrice, Italy
 Valpovo, Croatia

References

External links

  in Hungarian

Populated places in Baranya County
Socialist planned cities
Planned cities in Hungary
Baranya (region)
History of Baranya (region)